SS Skagway Victory was a Victory ship built for the United States during World War II. She was launched by the Oregon Shipbuilding Corporation on June 21, 1944, and was completed on July 15, 1944. The ship's US Maritime Commission designation was VC2-S-AP3, hull number 116 (V-116). She was built in 64 days under the Emergency Shipbuilding program. The Maritime Commission turned her over to a civilian contractor, the Alcoa, for operation until the end of World War II hostilities. She was operated under the US Merchant Marine Act for the War Shipping Administration.

Victory ships were designed to replace the earlier Liberty ships. Liberty ships were designed to be used solely for World War II, while Victory ships were designed to last longer and serve the US Navy after the war. The Victory ship differed from a Liberty ship in that they were faster, longer, wider, and taller, had a thinner stack set farther toward the superstructure and had a long raised forecastle.

SS Skagway Victory serviced in the Pacific Theater of Operations during the last months of World War II in the Pacific War. Skagway Victory took supplies to support the Battle of Okinawa.

World War II
SS Skagway Victory used her deck guns to fire at enemy planes from June 7 to 28, 1945, to defend both herself and other ships at Okinawa. Skagway Victory took supplies to support the troops at the Battle of Okinawa.

Post War
In 1949 Skagway Victory  was sold to States Marine Lines Inc. of Wilmington, Delaware and renamed SS Constitution State. In 1969 she was sold to Oneida Steamship Company Inc. of New York City and renamed the SS Silver Hawk.  On August 18, 1969, she was driven around and broke in a Hurricane Camille at Gulfport, Mississippi. She was not worth repairing due to her age. In 1970 she was scrapped in Gulfport.

References

Sources
 Sawyer, L.A. and W.H. Mitchell. Victory ships and tankers: The history of the 'Victory' type cargo ships and of the tankers built in the United States of America during World War II, Cornell Maritime Press, 1974, 0-87033-182-5.
 United States Maritime Commission: Victory Ships alphabetical list War II
 Victory Cargo Ships Oregon Shipyards Record Breakers Page 2
  p. 259

Victory ships
Ships built in Portland, Oregon
United States Merchant Marine
1944 ships
World War II merchant ships of the United States